Melderskin is a mountain peak in  Kvinnherad kommune in Hordaland. In the middle of the mountain there is a small U-valley where the waterfall begins, and the U-valley lies between two mountain peaks as seen in the image.

Melderskin is the nearest mountain to Ben Nevis (the highest mountain in the United Kingdom) that is higher than Ben Nevis, and therefore defines the topographic isolation of Ben Nevis: .

The name comes from the  Norse words  reports , which means 'grain that is ground into flour' and  skin  which means shine or shine. The meaning then becomes "the mountain with a shiny layer of snow on top".

Gallery

References

External links 
 Map and tour description, visitsunnhordland.no

One-thousanders